Hindley may refer to:

Places
 Hindley, Greater Manchester, England
 Hindley (ward), an electoral ward of the Wigan Metropolitan Borough Council
 Hindley, Northumberland, England

Other uses
 Hindley (surname)
 Hindley Manufacturing, an American wire-hardware manufacturer
 Hindley School, a school in the US
 HM Prison Hindley, a prison in England
Hindley Street, a place in Australia.